Sadwal Kalan is a village in Pakistan. Sadwal Kalan is a quite large village, which is situated about 3 kilometers away from kotla in east side. This Village is 38 kilometers away from Gujrat District and about 30 kilometers away from its Tehsile Kharian. The Union Council of Sadwal Kalan is Kakrali, which is 4 kilometers away to the north. The border of Azad Kashmir also lies in North direction of the Village which is about 10 Kilometers. The caste of mostly people belongs to this village are Jutt/Chaudhry.

Gallery

Neighbour villages
Kakrali
Kotla Arab Ali Khan	
Langrial  
Ropari
Sahan kalan
Sohntra 
Aach Goch
Pindi khokra
Chakh sikander

References

Union councils of Gujrat District
Villages in Kharian Tehsil